Rock Lake is a lake located in Algonquin Provincial Park in Haliburton County, Ontario, Canada.

Rock Lake features a campground with 121 sites at the north end of the lake which is accessible from Highway 60 via a gravel road. Algonquin Park also maintains about 20 designated campsites around the lake that are accessible by boat as well as several portages to neighbouring lakes. The lake is popular with canoeists and kayakers. Motors boats are permitted with a limit of 20 horsepower. About 20 cottages on long term leases are found on the shores of Rock Lake. The 5 km Booth's Rock hiking trail overlooks the Lake.

The Madawaska River flows into Rock Lake from the north and out of it in the southeast. The South Madawaska River enters Rock Lake from a long bay in the southwest.

Prehistoric camp sites as well as cairns and petroglyphs have been found around the area.

References

Lakes of Ontario
Lakes of Nipissing District